The  Great Miami Hurricane of 1926 was a large and intense tropical cyclone that devastated the Greater Miami area and caused catastrophic  damage in the Bahamas and the U.S. Gulf Coast in September of the year 1926, accruing a US$100 million damage toll. As a result of the devastation wrought by the hurricane  in Florida, the Land Boom in Florida ended.  The hurricane represented an early start to the Great Depression in the aftermath of the state's 1920s land boom. It has been estimated that a similar hurricane would cause about $235 billion in damage if it were to hit Miami in 2018.

The tropical cyclone is believed to have formed in the central Atlantic Ocean on September 11. Steadily strengthening as it tracked west-northwestward, the tropical storm reached hurricane intensity the next day. As a result of scattered observations at open sea, however, no ship encountered the storm until September 15, by which time the cyclone had reached major hurricane intensity north of the Virgin Islands. Strengthening continued up until the following day, when the storm reached peak intensity with a strength equivalent to a Category 4 hurricane. This intensity was maintained as the storm tracked across the Turks and Caicos and the Bahamas to landfall near Miami on September 18.

The cyclone caused immense destruction throughout the islands and across southern Florida. The storm destroyed hundreds of structures in its path over the islands, leaving thousands of residents homeless. At least 17 deaths occurred on the islands, though many others—some related only indirectly to the storm—were reported in the aftermath. Upon striking South Florida, the cyclone generated hurricane-force winds over a broad swath of the region, causing widespread and severe structural damage from both wind and water. Most of the deaths occurred near Lake Okeechobee, when a large storm surge breached muck dikes and drowned hundreds of people.

The hurricane quickly traversed the Florida peninsula before emerging into the Gulf of Mexico near Fort Myers. The storm flooded surrounding communities and barrier islands, while strong winds downed trees and disrupted electrical service. The storm later made two landfalls with weaker intensities on Alabama and Mississippi on September 20 and 21, respectively. The storm caused additional but less severe damage in those states, primarily from heavy rains and storm surge. Land interaction caused the cyclone to deteriorate and later dissipate on September 22.

Meteorological history

Due to the sparseness of available observations in the central Atlantic, the specific origins of the 1926 Miami hurricane remain unclear. Operationally, the United States Weather Bureau in Washington, D.C., did not begin issuing advisories on the cyclone until September 14. Tracking west-northwestward, the storm gradually intensified and reached hurricane intensity on September 12 while still east of the Lesser Antilles. The observation of low barometric pressures and winds suggesting cyclonic rotation at Saint Kitts on the evening of September 14 was the first to suggest that a hurricane had developed. By 06:00 UTC on September 15, the storm had strengthened further to major hurricane intensity north of the Virgin Islands.

Strengthening continued into September 16 as the hurricane reached a strength equivalent to that of a Category 4 on the modern-day Saffir–Simpson hurricane wind scale. With this strength the hurricane passed near the Turks and Caicos Islands, though its intensity at the time was based on the extent of damage there as any measurement device was knocked out by the damaging winds. Shortly afterward, the cyclone struck the Bahamian island of Mayaguana at its peak intensity. After passing the island, the hurricane slightly weakened but maintained formidable strength as it accelerated through the southern Bahamas, passing near Nassau on September 17. The storm then made a second landfall on Andros Island in the Mangrove Cay district early on September 18. Thereafter, the hurricane crossed Andros Island and passed over the Gulf Stream en route to Florida. The hurricane had weakened over South Florida as a result of land interaction, but re-strengthened after emerging into the Gulf of Mexico off Punta Rassa six hours later.

Although the storm had taken a more northwesterly course through the gulf, the hurricane later began paralleling the coast of the Florida Panhandle and thus slowly curved westward. After landfall, the storm quickly weakened and meandered off Alabama's barrier islands, eventually moving ashore for the last time on September 21 near Gulfport, Mississippi, as a tropical storm. The cyclone continued its decay inland, degenerating into a tropical depression the following day before dissipating over Louisiana shortly thereafter.

Preparations
On September 16, the United States Weather Bureau advised caution to ships tracking in Bahamian waters and the Florida Strait. The first tropical cyclone warning associated with the storm was a northeast storm warning issued on September 17 for the Florida coast from Jupiter Inlet to Key West, Florida. Warnings along the United States Eastern Seaboard eventually stretched as far north as Charleston, South Carolina, upon the storm's first landfall. Additional warnings were posted for the United States Gulf Coast on September 19 and covered coastal areas from Apalachicola, Florida, to Burrwood, Louisiana. Information on the storm as ascertained by the U.S. Weather Bureau was relayed by various radio and local press services, though the bureau specifically acknowledged the Mobile Register for their efforts in disseminating storm details.

Impact

Turks and Caicos and Bahamas
Although no fatalities were reported, the hurricane wrought extensive property damage to Grand Turk Island. Rain gauges recorded  of rain during the storm, and high surf left knee-deep sand drifts on the island. Reportedly, the winds even ripped spines from prickly pear cacti. Nearly all lighters at port were lost. The storm left 4,000 people homeless on three of the islands in the Turks and Caicos. Due to hampered communication, the extent of damage in the Bahamas was initially unclear. In the Bahamas, the storm flattened hundreds of structures and killed at least 17 people, mostly on Bimini, where seven people died and the greatest property damage occurred. The hurricane also leveled many structures on Andros, including churches and large buildings, and downed trees and other homes on New Providence. On parts of Andros, the storm snapped or felled almost all of the coconut palms, and in the Exuma district a large storm surge ruined many crops. Some sources say 25 people died on Bimini, but these may have been indirect deaths, as many people reportedly perished after drinking contaminated well water.

United States

The 1926 hurricane is known primarily for its impacts and lasting aftermath in South Florida, particularly in the Miami area. Effects were concentrated around Florida's southeastern coast and south-central Florida, with additional impacts in Northwest Florida. Damage figures from the storm in the state alone reached US$75 million and accounted for most of the damage that the tropical cyclone produced. Although the official number of fatalities would later be revised downward, initial estimates suggested that the death toll would likely be over 1,000 in Miami alone with an additional 2,000 injured. Nonetheless, the grave number of casualties forced resorts to serve as temporary morgues and hospitals. Homes and office buildings were used to serve as refugee camps for the approximately 38,000 people displaced by the hurricane.

Miami metropolitan area

The storm surge in South Florida was not as high as it would have been had the hurricane struck another area, owing to the deep offshore continental shelf, which increased the energy needed to sustain a large surge. The hurricane's high storm surge swept into Miami and Miami Beach, flooding city streets with knee-deep water. Yachts and large vessels were carried by the intense wind and waves onto shore. The MacArthur Causeway connecting Miami and Miami Beach was submerged under  of water.

Communication between the two locales as well as the rest of the United States was cut after all local telecommunications and power lines were blown down. Due to their susceptibility to strong winds, most wooden buildings in Miami were either blown down or lost their roofs. Concrete and steel buildings were warped at their bases. While skyscrapers mostly sustained minor damage, the 18-story Meyer-Kiser Building bore considerable damage. The structure reportedly swayed and vibrated precipitously during the storm; eyewitnesses likened it to the Charleston dance. Many of the injuries in the city were due to ballistic fragments of broken roofing including iron sheeting. Other structures across the region sustained significant damage. Strong winds leveled "hundreds" of working-class homes in Hialeah and severely damaged 70% of the town. Winds destroyed the interiors of buildings in Fort Lauderdale, the seat of Broward County, and ripped the roof from the Broward County courthouse. Despite having only 12,000 inhabitants, the town sustained severe damage to 3,500 of its buildings. Nearby, the storm severely damaged the abandoned New River House of Refuge. Cities as far north as Lake Park (then called Kelsey City) and West Palm Beach in Palm Beach County reported many roofs blown off, numerous small buildings destroyed, walls blown down, windows shattered, and trees, shrubs, and other objects torn apart or uprooted. The worst destruction occurred in the poorer, mostly black sections of the towns, where many homes were destroyed.

Along the east coast of South Florida, the storm caused widespread, significant beach erosion. At Hillsboro Inlet Light, high tides removed  of sand beneath the lighthouse. The hurricane swept away much of State Road A1A in Broward and Miami-Dade Counties. The combined force of waves and storm surge undermined coastal structures that collapsed, including multi-story casinos on Miami Beach, and washed out the coastal bridge on Florida State Road A1A at Baker's Haulover Inlet. In Boca Raton, waves were so large that they rose to the top of the high ridge on the barrier island, though they did not overtop it. High surf also destroyed a casino at the Boca Raton Inlet. "Knee-deep" water east of U.S. Route 1 (Federal Highway) in Boca Raton blocked beach access, but residents waded through. Meanwhile, large waves left much debris and sand drifts several feet deep on State Road A1A in Delray Beach. The waters of the Lake Worth Lagoon overflowed their banks, submerging nearby streets, parks, and golf courses. High tides piled debris on the streets of Palm Beach, caused a beachfront boardwalk to collapse, and exacerbated previous damage from the July hurricane. On Hollywood beach, waves smashed windows and invaded the interior of the Hollywood Beach Hotel. People on the second floor found sand drifts reaching "half way to the ceiling."

The storm also ravaged entertainment venues and historic sites. The storm flattened the Fulford–Miami Speedway in North Miami Beach, which then ceased operation. Winds peeled into pieces the roof of the grandstand at Hialeah Race Track and destroyed the kennels, allowing racing greyhounds to escape. The storm wrecked prominent restaurants and tourist attractions on Miami Beach, including the Million Dollar Pier. Many historic structures throughout South Florida sustained significant damage, including the Barnacle and the Villa Vizcaya, where the yacht Nepenthe and fishing boat Psyche were sunk. The storm damaged the main residence at the Bonnet House—the only hurricane to do so since the latter was first built. No other storm since 1926 caused a similar level of destruction to the property until Hurricane Wilma in 2005.

The storm ruined cultivated areas throughout South Florida. The storm flooded the surrounding citrus crop and agricultural fields south of Miami, particularly near Homestead and Florida City,destroying half of the citrus-bearing trees in the area.

Everglades, Lake Okeechobee, and Southwest Florida

A storm surge from Lake Okeechobee entirely inundated Clewiston, reportedly leaving numerous bodies along the road connecting the city with Miami. Further inland, the surge burst through frail, earthen,  muck dikes, submerging Moore Haven under  of water. Residents scrambled, often unsuccessfully, to safety on rooftops but were swept away by the winds and storm surge. A nearby drainage dam was destroyed, causing additional flooding of the countryside. Most of the city's buildings were swept off of their original foundations. Reports by the Red Cross and local authorities indicated that 150 human corpses were found in Moore Haven alone; their estimates were incomplete as many bodies were never found, reportedly having been swept deep into the Everglades. Estimates of the dead near Lake Okeechobee ranged as high as 300. Two years later, another Category 4 hurricane killed at least 2,500 people along Lake Okeechobee, but mostly affected the eastern shore, leaving Moore Haven largely unscathed.

The Gulf Coast of the Florida peninsula saw comparatively less damage compared to Greater Miami but still suffered significant impacts. A peak storm tide of  affected Punta Rassa and the islands of Captiva and Sanibel, causing $3,000,000 in flood damage. The storm opened Redfish Pass between Captiva and North Captiva islands. Between Tampa and Naples, strong winds destroyed windows and felled trees and power poles. In Fort Myers, citrus crops sustained some damage and public utilities were put out of commission. Strong winds uprooted trees in St. Petersburg, while heavy rainfall caused flooding in the outlying districts of nearby Tampa. South of the eye, a storm tide of  submerged the streets of Everglades City, forcing people into the upper stories of buildings. Homes that were not secured to their foundations floated away on the tide. Tides reached  as far south as Flamingo, sending seaweed, fish, and mud into dwellings. The project headquarters of Poinciana, a development project in the lower Ten Thousand Islands, were destroyed; the project was subsequently abandoned.

Florida Panhandle and elsewhere

Although the hurricane weakened before striking the upper Gulf Coast, its slow movement produced substantial effects to coastal regions between Mobile and Pensacola; these areas experienced heavy damage from wind, rain, and storm surge. Wind records at Pensacola indicate that the city encountered sustained winds of hurricane force for more than 20 hours, including winds above  for five hours. The storm tide destroyed nearly all waterfront structures on Pensacola Bay and peaked at  near Bagdad, Florida. Rainfall peaked at Bay Minette, Alabama, where  fell.

Aftermath

The disarray in Miami following the hurricane's passage led to a breakout of looting in the city's African-American districts that resulted in seven arrests. This unrest prompted the declaration of martial law with the swearing-in of 300 special policemen for voluntary duty. Similarly, 200 policemen were placed on duty in Hollywood, Florida. After a survey indicated that the available food and water supplies would only last 30 days, hoarding was banned. Soup kitchens were set up in Miami's business district in order to serve food to the recently displaced and as a source for clean drinking water that was contaminated in other areas. The first aid arriving from outside the impacted areas was a relief train guarded by state militiamen that carted medical staff, medicine, potable water, and other relief supplies into Miami immediately following the storm's passage. Afterwards, then-U.S. president Calvin Coolidge placed the United States Army and Coast Guard on standby should relief efforts necessitate their presence in Florida and the Bahamas. The Red Cross offered its facilities and the Pullman Company offered its resources for use in relief efforts. The National Guard of the United States dispatched several companies of guardsmen to disaster areas following urgent appeals from then-Florida governor John W. Martin. In response to the widespread destruction of buildings on Miami Beach, John J. Farrey was appointed chief building, plumbing and electrical inspector. He initiated and enforced the first building code in the United States, which more than 5,000 US cities duplicated.

According to the American Red Cross, the storm caused 372 fatalities, including 114 from the city of Miami, but these totals apparently do not include deaths outside the United States. Prior to 2003, the National Weather Service had long accepted 243 as the number of deaths, but historical research indicated that this total was far too low. The NWS then updated its totals to reflect the new findings. Even the estimates for the United States are uncertain and vary, since there were many people, especially transients and colored migrants in South Florida, listed as "missing". About 43,000 people were left homeless, mostly in the Miami area. The toll for the storm in the United States was $100 million ($  USD). It is estimated that if an identical storm hit in the year 2005, with modern development and prices, the storm would have caused $140–157 billion in damage ($196 billion in 2016); this would make the storm the costliest on record in the United States, adjusted for inflation, if it were to occur in contemporary times.

Several events, including the sinking of a ship in the Miami harbor and an embargo by the Florida East Coast Railroad before the storm, weakened the Florida land boom of the 1920s in South Florida. However, the storm is considered the final blow to end the boom locally. Thousands of newcomers to Florida left the state and cleared their bank accounts, leaving many banks to the brink of bankruptcy. As a result, the Great Depression of 1929 did not make a great impact to Florida unlike the rest of the country. Many planned developments, which had fallen into deadlock due to insufficient resources, were abandoned due to the economic effects of the hurricane. In Boca Raton, for instance, one planned community by Addison Mizner, called Villa Rica, was destroyed by the hurricane and never rebuilt. South Florida did not achieve full economic recovery until the 1940s.

The University of Miami, located in Coral Gables, had been founded in 1925 and opened its doors for the first time just days after the hurricane passed.  The university's athletic teams were nicknamed the Hurricanes in memory of this catastrophe. The school's mascot is Sebastian, an ibis. The ibis is a small white bird that can be seen around South Florida, including on the UM campus. According to folklore, the ibis is the last bird to leave before a hurricane strikes and the first to return after the storm, hence its selection for the school mascot.

See also

Hurricane Andrew – caused unprecedented destruction in Greater Miami before striking Louisiana
Hurricane Harvey – the costliest tropical cyclone in American history, noted for floods in Greater Houston
1947 Fort Lauderdale hurricane – intense hurricane whose effects were lessened in southern Florida thanks to improved warning systems
1945 Homestead hurricane – tracked across the Bahamas before curving into Florida and causing extensive damage
1928 Okeechobee hurricane – third-deadliest tropical cyclone in American history, struck nearly two years to date after the 1926 hurricane

Notes

References

Bibliography

 A first hand account written in 1926.

External links

List of People Killed in the Great Miami Hurricane of 1926
1926 issue of the Monthly Weather Review
United States Hurricane History
NOAA hurricane lists

Historic Images of Florida Hurricanes (Florida State Archives)

Miami
1926
Hurricanes in Florida
Hurricanes in Alabama
20th century in Miami
Miami Hurricane
Lake Okeechobee
1926 natural disasters in the United States